Philip Marlowe, Private Eye is an American mystery series that aired on HBO in the United States from April 16, 1983 through June 3, 1986, and on ITV in the United Kingdom. The series features Powers Boothe as Raymond Chandler's title character, and was the first drama produced for HBO.  Unlike other modern incarnations of the Marlowe character, the HBO series kept the show set in the 1930s, true to the original Raymond Chandler stories.

Synopsis
The series chronicles the cases of private detective Philip Marlowe. Set in Los Angeles during the 1930s, storylines were adapted from Chandler's short stories. Philip Marlowe, Private Eye aired in two short runs beginning in April 1983 to June 1983 in the US and May 1984 in the UK. The second run began in April 1986 and ended in June 1986.

Cast
 Powers Boothe as Philip Marlowe
 Kathryn Leigh Scott as Annie Riordan (first season)
 William Kearns as Lieutenant Victor "Violets" Magee (first season)

Episodes

Season 1 (1983)

Season 2 (1986)

Awards and nominations

References

External links

1983 British television series debuts
1986 British television series endings
1980s American crime drama television series
1980s British crime drama television series
1980s British mystery television series
HBO original programming
ITV (TV network) original programming
Television series set in the 1930s
Television shows based on American novels
Television shows based on short fiction
Television shows set in Los Angeles
American detective television series
English-language television shows
Adaptations of works by Raymond Chandler
British detective television series